İsmail Ayaz (born 20 July 1988) is a Turkish professional footballer who plays as a midfielder for Kırklarelispor.

Ayaz made his professional debut for Kasımpaşa in a 1–0 win over Eskişehirspor on 13 December 2014.

References

External links
 
 

1995 births
People from Gaziosmanpaşa
Living people
Turkish footballers
Kasımpaşa S.K. footballers
Eyüpspor footballers
Sarıyer S.K. footballers
TFF Second League players
Association football midfielders